Chevington is a village and civil parish in the West Suffolk district of Suffolk in East Anglia, England. Located around 10 km south-west of Bury St Edmunds, in 2005 its population was 630, reducing to 602 at the 2011 Census.  The parish also contains the hamlets of Broad Green and Tan Office Green.

Name
The name Chevington is from Old English Ceofan-tūn, meaning the farm of a man named Ceofa (genitive case Ceofan).
It appeared in Domesday Book as Ceuentuna; 200 years later it was typically Chevintun or Cheveton and from 1535 the modern spelling Chevington is recorded.  The etymology proves that the -ing- syllable is not original, but is by analogy with similar names.

History
Chevington was a part of the Saxon estate of Britulf, but was given over to the Abbey of St Edmund after the Norman Conquest. 
The Abbey in Bury had been founded by the Benedictines in 1020 to shelter the remains of St Edmund and became one of the largest in England.

1086, 'Little Domesday' Book: The Abbot held Ceuentuna, a manor of 6 caracutes*. There were 13 villeins**, 6 slaves, 140 sheep, 40 goats & 3 hives of bees. There was also one 'soakman' *** who probably farmed 30 acres. 
[* or hides abt 800 acres, ** tied tenants, *** free tenant]

Besides generating income for the Abbey, some of the woods were used as a retreat for hunting deer and fishing for the Abbot and guests.

1268, The Abbot, John de Norwold, owned 460 acres of arable land in Chevington, 8 acres of meadow, 4 acres of wood & a windmill. 
His villeins held 322 acres of arable land, 2 acres of wood & 3 acres of pasture. The Cottars held 18 acres of arable land. 
Adam & Robert de Seburgh were free tenants, 
with the Pamans owning land with virtual right of occupation.

Chevington was a 'closed' parish, with movement into the village restricted until the early 19th century, and as a high proportion of the parish was owned by a single family, there were relatively few freeholders.

Leading people in the village in 1844
ALLEN – Holly Bush Green, gent,

BRIDGE – carpenter,

EDWARD – wheelwright,

FENTON – bricklayer & builder,

MAYHEW – shopkeeper,

PARKER – shoe-maker & schoolmaster,

ROLFE – gentleman,

SIMKIN James – beer-house keeper,

SIMKIN John – thatcher,

WHITE rev John – rectory,

WHITE Misses Elis & Frances,

WITHAM J – shopkeeper,

WRIGHT Christopher – butcher,

Farmers in the village in 1844,

ADAMS – Hill House,

ARGENT R,

BREWSTER Sam – Coolege Farm,

FINCH J – Holly Bush Green,

GOSSICK J – Horse Pool,

JENNISON W – Chevington Lodge,

KEMP J – Chevington Hall,

KEMP J – malster,

ROLFE W – corn miller,

SIMKIN Robert J – Garrod's Farm & vet,

SIMKIN Robert – Hole,

TRUGGITT – Broad Green,

WEBB John – Moat Farm,

Historical writings

In 1870–72, John Marius Wilson's Imperial Gazetteer of England and Wales described the village as:

CHEVINGTON, a parish in Thingoe district, Suffolk; 2¾ miles S of Saxham r. station, and 5 SW by W of Bury St. Edmunds. It has a post office under Bury St. Edmunds. Acres, 2,429. Real property, £3,889. Population, 621. Houses, 126. The property is much subdivided. The living is a rectory in the diocese of Ely. Value, £396. Patron, the Rev. J. White. The church is ancient. There is an endowed school, and charities £22.

In 1887, John Bartholomew also wrote an entry on Chevington in the Gazetteer of the British Isles with a much shorter description:

Chevington, parish, W. Suffolk, 5 miles SW. of (Bury St Edmunds, 2429 acres, population 556; P.O.

Sites of interest

Church of All Saints

A church was recorded in Domesday Book, but replaced by a Norman church built in stone in about the 12th century, with parts still existing although  it has been extensively altered since. 
In the 16th century, the bell tower was added, which was increased in height in the early 19th century, said to be so it could be seen from the new hall at Ickworth.
In about 1700, the roof was lowered & shortened in length.

Chevington Park Cottages

there was a hunting lodge, part of which was converted into cottages.

Former Rectory

College Farmhouse,

is thought to have been the site of a college for secular priests. Some original timbers are still embedded behind the 18th-century façade.

Moat Farmhouse at Brooks's Corner,
 
is a grade II* domestic building. It is from the early 15th century, with some later alterations & extensions. It is an example of a three-cell open hall house with a late 16th-century first floor and attic. It is likely that the rear wing of the house, formerly moated, was added at the same time as the first floor of the hall.

Ruffin's Farmhouse,

15th century. It is an open-hall timber-framed house of the Wealden type with later extensions as late as the 17th century on the east.

The Lodge

David Clarkson's

Broad Green House, altered in the 19th century.
 
Batleys House in Depden Lane, later called Hole Farm with a 17th-century axial red brick chimney, it was one owned by Dr John Battely, Archdeacon of Canterbury, occupied by the Simkens in the 19th century.

Horsepool Farmhouse

Tan Office Farmhouse,
 
with a cross-passage entry & jettied upper floor, it was rebuilt in the 16th century with two bays.

The Old Rectory,

originally moated, it was built in the 16th century, but reconstructed in the 18th. The rear is the oldest section.

Chevington Hall
It is on the site of an ancient camp, of which little is known. The earthworks and a fosse surrounding the hall are thought to have been constructed for defence and appear to predate the Romans. It was used as the retreat house of the Abbots of St. Edmunds Abbey from the 13th century. After the Dissolution, it became a manor house for Thomas Kytson of Hengrave and then later the Gages, who became the largest land-owners in the district. Margaret Bourchier, Countess of Bath, widow of Thomas Kytson, may have carried out modifications to the Abbot's Hall, which retained its general plan, steep roof and mullioned windows and incorporating some framing members from the Hall.
The current farmhouse, is mid 16th century with alterations, timber-framed, but encased in painted brick at front and sides. It has two storeys, hipped plain-tiled roof with axial chimneys of red brick, 18th-century mullioned and transomed windows of 4 & 6 lights. Late 18th-century 6-panelled entrance door with architrave and flat canopy.

Stonehouse Farmhouse,
 
formerly the Old Factory Farmhouse, is situated near the original Clothing Factory of 1852. It is timber framed & previously thatched. It is mainly 17th century.

Grazier's House of Weather Cock Hill,
 
with its attics & axial chimney of red brick, possibly where Robert Somerton had his house in the 14th century. 
Hollybush Stud, site of Seburgh's where a Robert Gooday once lived in the early 17th century.

Mill House,

about 1680. Thatched, with a 3 cell lobby entrance & an interesting red brick chimney. 
It was where William Rolfe, the miller lived in 1850.

Chevington Grove later Tallyho Stud,

was owned by the Whites for close on a century. The rear is a Queen Anne fragment of about 1710, but the front appears to be later. 
This very beautiful house has a 19th-century service wing running at right angles on the back.

Thatched Cottage on Church Rd,

probably from the 18th century, was inhabited for a lengthy period by the Arbon family. 
The steep roof does not possess dormers and there is a single prominent central chimney. 
The lean-to building on the west side was once used as a shop.

Shoemeadow Cottage,

timber-framed from the 18th century. It hides in the valley near Chevington Way between Ickworth & Chedburgh.

Raie Wilman's house on Weathercock Hill,

is Grade II from the 18th century although there is parts from the 17th century and perhaps earlier. 
At one time the house was divided into four or five cottages. 
Still thatched, the main timber-framed building has two stories with a distinguished newel staircase leading from the ground floor.

Demography
In the 2001 census, Chevington had a population of 603 with 248 households.

Population change

Location grid

References

Further reading

 Traces the life of Chevington farmer Robert Parman (c.1405 – 1475), and so contains historical details of Chevington and its people during his lifetime.
'WHITE'S 1844 SUFFOLK History, Gazetteer, & Directory of Suffolk' by William White

External links

Villages in Suffolk
Civil parishes in Suffolk
Borough of St Edmundsbury